Toni is a 1956 studio album by Toni Harper, accompanied by the Oscar Peterson trio.

Track listing
 "Can't We Be Friends?" (Paul James, Kay Swift) – 3:26
 "I Could Write a Book" (Lorenz Hart, Richard Rodgers) – 2:36
 "Gone with the Wind" (Allie Wrubel, Herb Magidson) – 2:21
 "Singin' in the Rain" (Arthur Freed, Nacio Herb Brown) – 2:51
 "Love for Sale" (Cole Porter) – 5:34
 "Just A-Sittin' and A-Rockin'" (Duke Ellington, Billy Strayhorn, Lee Gaines) – 3:22
 "A Foggy Day" (George Gershwin, Ira Gershwin) – 3:02
 "You Don't Know What Love Is" (Gene de Paul) – 2:35
 "Bewitched, Bothered and Bewildered" (Rodgers, Hart) – 4:19
 "Little Girl Blue" (Rodgers, Hart) – 3:23
 "You Took Advantage of Me" (Rodgers, Hart) – 2:39
 "Like Someone in Love" (Jimmy Van Heusen, Johnny Burke) – 4:23

Personnel
 Toni Harper - vocals
 Oscar Peterson – piano
 Ray Brown – double bass
 Herb Ellis - guitar

References

1956 debut albums
Toni Harper albums
Albums produced by Norman Granz
Verve Records albums